A green economy is an economy that aims at reducing environmental risks and ecological scarcities, and that aims for sustainable development without degrading the environment. It is closely related with ecological economics, but has a more politically applied focus. The 2011 UNEP Green Economy Report argues "that to be green, an economy must not only be efficient, but also fair. Fairness implies recognizing global and country level equity dimensions, particularly in assuring a Just Transition to an economy that is low-carbon, resource efficient, and socially inclusive."

A feature distinguishing it from prior economic regimes is the direct valuation of natural capital and ecological services as having economic value (see The Economics of Ecosystems and Biodiversity and Bank of Natural Capital) and a full cost accounting regime in which costs externalized onto society via ecosystems are reliably traced back to, and accounted for as liabilities of, the entity that does the harm or neglects an asset.

Green sticker and ecolabel practices have emerged as consumer facing indicators of friendliness to the environment and sustainable development. Many industries are starting to adopt these standards as a way to promote their greening practices in a globalizing economy. Also known as sustainability standards, these standards are special rules that guarantee the products bought don’t hurt the environment and the people that make them. The number of these standards has grown recently and they can now help build a new, greener economy. They focus on economic sectors like forestry, farming, mining or fishing among others; concentrate on environmental factors like protecting water sources and biodiversity, or reducing greenhouse gas emissions; support social protections and workers’ rights; and home in on specific parts of production processes.

Green economists and economics 
Green economics is loosely defined as any theory of economics by which an economy is considered to be component of the ecosystem in which it resides (after Lynn Margulis).  A holistic approach to the subject is typical, such that economic ideas are commingled with any number of other subjects, depending on the particular theorist.  Proponents of feminism, postmodernism, the environmental movement, peace movement, Green politics, green anarchism and anti-globalization movement have used the term to describe very different ideas, all external to mainstream economics.

The use of the term is further ambiguated by the political distinction of Green parties which are formally organized and claim the capitalised Green term as a unique and distinguishing mark. It is thus preferable to refer to a loose school of "'green economists"' who generally advocate shifts towards a green economy, biomimicry and a fuller accounting for biodiversity.  (See The Economics of Ecosystems and Biodiversity especially for current authoritative international work towards these goals and Bank of Natural Capital for a layperson's presentation of these.)

Some economists view green economics as a branch or subfield of more established schools.  For instance, it is regarded as classical economics where the traditional land is generalized to natural capital and has some attributes in common with labor and physical capital (since natural capital assets like rivers directly substitute for man-made ones such as canals). Or, it is viewed as Marxist economics with nature represented as a form of Lumpenproletariat, an exploited base of non-human workers providing surplus value to the human economy, or as a branch of neoclassical economics in which the price of life for developing vs. developed nations is held steady at a ratio reflecting a balance of power and that of non-human life is very low.

An increasing commitment by the UNEP (and national governments such as the UK) to the ideas of natural capital and full cost accounting under the banner 'green economy' could blur distinctions between the schools and redefine them all as variations of "green economics".  As of 2010 the Bretton Woods institutions (notably the World Bank and International Monetary Fund (via its "Green Fund" initiative) responsible for global monetary policy have stated a clear intention to move towards biodiversity valuation and a more official and universal biodiversity finance.
Taking these into account targeting not less but radically zero emission and waste is what is promoted by the Zero Emissions Research and Initiatives. The UNEP 2011 Green Economy Report informs that "based on existing studies, the annual financing demand to green the global economy was estimated to be in the range US$1.05 to US$2.59 trillion. To place this demand in perspective, it is about one-tenth of total global investment per year, as measured by global Gross Capital Formation."

At COP26, the European Investment Bank announced a set of just transition common principles agreed upon with multilateral development banks, which also align with the Paris Agreement. The principles refer to focusing financing on the transition to net zero carbon economies, while keeping socioeconomic effects in mind, along with policy engagement and plans for inclusion and gender equality, all aiming to deliver long-term economic transformation.

The African Development Bank, Asian Development Bank, Islamic Development Bank, Council of Europe Development Bank, Asian Infrastructure Investment Bank, European Bank for Reconstruction and Development, New Development Bank, and Inter-American Development Bank are among the multilateral development banks that have vowed to uphold the principles of climate change mitigation and a Just Transition. The World Bank Group also contributed.

Definition
Karl Burkart defined a green economy as based on six main sectors:
 Renewable energy 
 Green buildings
 Sustainable transport
 Water management 
 Waste management
 Land management

The International Chamber of Commerce (ICC) representing global business defines green economy as "an economy in which economic growth and environmental responsibility work together in a mutually reinforcing fashion while supporting progress on social development".

In 2012, the ICC published the Green Economy Roadmap, containing contributions from international experts consulted bi-yearly. The Roadmap represents a comprehensive and multidisciplinary effort to clarify and frame the concept of "green economy". It highlights the role of business in bringing solutions to global challenges. It sets out the following 10 conditions which relate to business/intra-industry and collaborative action for a transition towards a green economy:

 Open and competitive markets
 Metrics, accounting, and reporting
 Finance and investment
 Awareness
 Life cycle approach
 Resource efficiency and decoupling
 Employment
 Education and skills
 Governance and partnership
 Integrated policy and decision-making

Finance and investing

Green growth 
Approximately 57% of businesses responding to a survey are investing in energy efficiency, 64% in reducing and recycling trash, and 32% in new, less polluting industries and technologies. Roughly 40% of businesses made investments in energy efficiency in 2021.

Ecological measurements
Measuring economic output and progress is done through the use of economic index indicators. Green indices emerged from the need to measure human ecological impact, efficiency sectors like transport, energy, buildings and tourism, as well as the investment flows targeted to areas like renewable energy and cleantech innovation. 
 2016 - 2022 Green Score City Index is an ongoing study measuring the anthropogenic impact human activity has on nature.
 2010 - 2018 Global Green Economy Index™ (GGEI), published by consultancy Dual Citizen LLC is in its 6th edition. It measures the green economic performance and perceptions of it in 130 countries along four main dimensions of leadership & climate change, efficiency sectors, markets & investment and the environment.
 2009 - 2013 Circles of Sustainability project scored 5 cities in 5 separate countries.
 2009 - 2012 Green City Index  A global study commissioned by Siemens

Ecological footprint measurements are a way to gauge anthropogenic impact and are another standard used by municipal governments.

Green energy issues 
Green economies require a transition to green energy generation based on renewable energy to replace  fossil fuels as well as energy conservation and efficient energy use.  Renewables, like solar energy and wind energy, may eliminate the use of fossil fuels for electricity by 2035 and replace fossil fuel usage altogether by 2050.

The market failure to respond to environmental protection and climate protection needs can be attributed to high external costs and high initial costs for research, development, and marketing of green energy sources and green products. The green economy may need government subsidies as market incentives to motivate firms to invest and produce green products and services. The German Renewable Energy Act, legislations of many other member states of the European Union and the American Recovery and Reinvestment Act of 2009, all provide such market incentives. However, other experts argue that green strategies can be highly profitable for corporations that understand the business case for sustainability and can market green products and services beyond the traditional green consumer.

In the United States, it seemed as though the nuclear industry was coming to an end by the mid-1990s. Until 2013, there had been no new nuclear power facilities built since 1977. One reason was due to the economic reliance on fossil fuel-based energy sources. Additionally, there was a public fear of nuclear energy due to the Three Mile Island accident and the Chernobyl disaster. The Bush administration passed the 2005 Energy Bill that granted the nuclear industry around 10 million dollars to encourage research and development efforts. With the increasing threat of climate change, nuclear energy has been highlighted as an option to work to decarbonize the atmosphere and reverse climate change. Nuclear power forces environmentalists and citizens around the world to weigh the pro and cons of using nuclear power as a renewable energy source. The controversial nature of nuclear power has the potential to split the green economy movement into two branches— anti-nuclear and pro-nuclear.

According to a European climate survey, 63% of EU residents, 59% of Britons, 50% of Americans and 60% of Chinese respondents are in favor of switching to renewable energy. As of 2021, 18% of Americans are in favor of natural gas as a source of energy. For Britons and EU citizens nuclear energy is a more popular energy alternative.

After the COVID-19 pandemic, Eastern European and Central Asian businesses fall behind their Southern European counterparts in terms of the average quality of their green management practices, notably in terms of specified energy consumption and emissions objectives.

External variables, such as consumer pressure and energy taxes, are more relevant than firm-level features, such as size and age, in influencing the quality of green management practices. Firms with less financial limitations and stronger green management practices are more likely to invest in a bigger variety of green initiatives. Energy efficiency investments are good to both the bottom line and the environment.

The shift to greener energy and the adoption of more climate regulations are expected to have a 30% positive impact on businesses, mostly through new business prospects, and a 30% negative impact, according to businesses that took part in a survey in 2022. A little over 40% of the same businesses do not anticipate the transition to greener alternatives to alter their operations.

Criticism 

A number of organisations and individuals have criticised aspects of the 'Green Economy', particularly the mainstream conceptions of it based on using price mechanisms to protect nature, arguing that this will extend corporate control into new areas from forestry to water. The research organisation ETC Group argues that the corporate emphasis on bio-economy "will spur even greater convergence of corporate power and unleash the most massive resource grab in more than 500 years." Venezuelan professor Edgardo Lander says that the UNEP's report, Towards a Green Economy, while well-intentioned "ignores the fact that the capacity of existing political systems to establish regulations and restrictions to the free operation of the markets – even when a large majority of the population call for them – is seriously limited by the political and financial power of the corporations."

Ulrich Hoffmann, in a paper for UNCTAD also says that the focus on Green Economy and "green growth" in particular, "based on an evolutionary (and often reductionist) approach will not be sufficient to cope with the complexities of [[climate
change]]" and "may rather give much false hope and excuses to do nothing really fundamental that can bring about a U-turn of global greenhouse gas emissions. Clive Spash, an ecological economist, has criticised the use of economic growth to address environmental losses, and argued that the Green Economy, as advocated by the UN, is not a new approach at all and is actually a diversion from the real drivers of environmental crisis.  He has also criticised the UN's project on the economics of ecosystems and biodiversity (TEEB), and the basis for valuing ecosystems services in monetary terms.

See also 

 Agroecology
 Carbon fee and dividend
 Circular economy
 Degrowth
 Eco-capitalism
 Eco-socialism
 Ecology of contexts
 Embodied energy
 Embodied water
 Energy accounting
 Energy economics
 Energy policy
 Environmental economics
 Environmental ethics
 Free-market environmentalism
 Green accounting
 Green recovery
 Greenwashing
 Human ecology
 Industrial ecology
 International Journal of Green Economics
 ISO 14000
 Market governance mechanism
 Natural resource economics
 Outline of green politics
 Pigovian tax
 Renewable energy commercialization
 Restoration economy
 Social ecology
 Sustainable design
 Sustainable finance
 World energy consumption

References

Further reading
 Jeremy Rifkin (2013), "The Third Industrial Revolution" . VII,233-242

External links
 Green Growth Knowledge Platform
 ICC Green Economy Roadmap 2012
 Green Economy Coalition 
 UNEP – Green Economy 
 Green Economics Institute

Schools of economic thought
Industrial ecology
Natural resources
Resource economics
Economy by field